Přemysl Kovář (born 14 October 1985) is a former Czech footballer who last played as a goalkeeper for Slavia Prague.

Career
On 12 September 2016, Kovář joined Bulgarian club Cherno More Varna as free agent. In December 2016, he signed a 3-years contract with Slavia Prague.

References

External links

1985 births
Living people
Czech footballers
Czech Republic under-21 international footballers
1. FC Slovácko players
FC Slovan Liberec players
FK Ústí nad Labem players
FK Viktoria Žižkov players
FK Varnsdorf players
Hapoel Haifa F.C. players
PFC Cherno More Varna players
SK Slavia Prague players
Expatriate footballers in Greece
Expatriate footballers in Israel
Expatriate footballers in Bulgaria
Czech expatriate footballers
Czech expatriate sportspeople in Greece
Czech expatriate sportspeople in Israel
Czech expatriate sportspeople in Bulgaria
Czech First League players
Israeli Premier League players
First Professional Football League (Bulgaria) players
Association football goalkeepers
People from Boskovice
Czech National Football League players
Sportspeople from the South Moravian Region